Buzara roulera is a moth of the family Erebidae first described by Charles Swinhoe in 1909. It is found on Kai Island in Indonesia.

References

Calpinae
Moths described in 1909